Christopher Lykes (born July 22, 1998) is an American professional basketball player for Horsens IC of the Basketligaen. He played college basketball for the Miami Hurricanes and the Arkansas Razorbacks.

Early life and high school career
Lykes began playing basketball in second grade and competed for Gonzaga College High School in Washington, D.C. He was a starter since his freshman season, despite standing only . As a sophomore, he helped his team win the Washington Catholic Athletic Conference (WCAC) championship over top recruit Markelle Fultz and DeMatha Catholic High School. In his junior season, Lykes averaged 22 points and 4.3 assists per game and was named WCAC player of the year and D.C. Gatorade Player of the Year. 

As a senior, he averaged 17.6 points and 4.2 assists, repeating as WCAC player of the year. On February 16, 2017, Lykes became his school's all-time leading scorer, passing Tom Sluby. He finished his career with 2,266 points. Lykes helped Gonzaga win a postseason triple crown, with WCAC, District of Columbia State Athletic Association (DCSAA) and Alhambra Catholic Invitational titles. He was a four-star recruit and the No. 48 player in the 2017 class, according to ESPN. Lykes committed to playing college basketball for Miami (Florida) over offers from Villanova, among other NCAA Division I programs. He was drawn to Miami due to the success of fellow undersized guards Shane Larkin and Ángel Rodríguez with the program.

College career
As a freshman, Lykes averaged 9.6 points and 2.3 assists per game. He developed a close friendship with teammate Lonnie Walker IV. During his sophomore season, Miami coach Jim Larrañaga called him "crazy, but he's also crazy good" for his tendency to make risky plays that usually turn out well. Lykes scored a career-high 28 points on January 3, 2019, in a 87–82 loss to NC State. Lykes scored 20 points in a loss to North Carolina on January 19, and tied a season-high with four three-pointers. Lykes averaged 16.2 points, 2.7 rebounds and 3.2 assists per game as a sophomore. He was named to the Atlantic Coast Conference (ACC) All-Academic Team for the second straight season. Coming into his junior season, Lykes was named Preseason Second Team All-ACC. Lykes missed four games in January 2020 with a groin injury. He sat out  a game against Syracuse on March 8 with a laceration near his eye. As a junior, Lykes averaged 15.4 points, 2.4 assists, and 2.1 rebounds per game. Lykes was named All-ACC Honorable Mention. Two games into his senior season, he suffered a season-ending ankle injury. Lykes transferred to Arkansas for his final year of eligibility, choosing the Razorbacks over USC.

Career statistics

College

|-
| style="text-align:left;"| 2017–18
| style="text-align:left;"| Miami
| 32 || 10 || 21.6 || .402 || .345 || .720 || 1.2 || 2.3 || .8 || .0 || 9.6
|-
| style="text-align:left;"| 2018–19
| style="text-align:left;"| Miami
| 32 || 32 || 33.8 || .406 || .318 || .781 || 2.7 || 3.2 || 1.3 || .0 || 16.2
|-
| style="text-align:left;"| 2019–20
| style="text-align:left;"| Miami
| 26 || 24 || 30.1 || .432 || .381 || .814 || 2.1 || 2.4 || 1.1 || .3 || 15.4
|-
| style="text-align:left;"| 2020–21
| style="text-align:left;"| Miami
| 2 || 2 || 28.5 || .364 || .455 || .909 || 4.0 || 5.5 || 2.0 || .5 || 15.5
|-
| style="text-align:left;"| 2021–22
| style="text-align:left;"| Arkansas
| 37 || 2 || 17.3 || .344 || .281 || .875 || 1.0 || 1.5 || .9 || .0 || 7.6
|- class="sortbottom"
| style="text-align:center;" colspan="2"| Career
| 129 || 70 || 25.2 || .401 || .336 || .806 || 1.7 || 2.4 || 1.0 || .1 || 11.9

References

External links
Arkansas Razorbacks bio
Miami Hurricanes bio

1998 births
Living people
American men's basketball players
Arkansas Razorbacks men's basketball players
Basketball players from Maryland
Miami Hurricanes men's basketball players
People from Mitchellville, Maryland
Point guards